"Radioactive" is a song by American pop rock band Imagine Dragons from their major-label debut EP Continued Silence and later on their debut studio album, Night Visions (2012), as the opening track. It was first sent to modern rock radio on October 29, 2012, and then released to contemporary hit radio on April 9, 2013. Musically, "Radioactive" is an electronic rock and alternative rock song with elements of dubstep. In a 2021 podcast interview called The Turning Point,  Dan Reynolds revealed that after almost a decade, he had realized that lyrics were actually about him not giving up hope after losing faith in Mormonism.  

The song received positive reviews from critics, who praised the production, lyrics, and vocals, calling it a highlight on the album. Due to heavy rotation on various commercials and trailers, the song became a sleeper hit, peaking at number three on the US Billboard Hot 100 chart and becoming the band's first top 10 single as well as being the third best selling song in that country in 2013. It also broke the record for slowest ascension to the top 5 in chart history and held the record for most weeks spent on the Billboard Hot 100 at 87 weeks, a record for over seven years. The song has also reached number one in Sweden and in the top 20 in several countries including Australia, Canada, New Zealand and the United Kingdom, becoming Imagine Dragons' most successful single to date. It has since been certified Diamond in the US, making it one of the best selling singles of all time.

"Radioactive" received two Grammy Awards nominations for Record of the Year and Best Rock Performance, winning the latter. This was Imagine Dragons' first time being nominated. During the broadcast, they presented a remix of the song with their Interscope label-mate, rapper Kendrick Lamar. The remix was later released for purchase on iTunes.

Composition
"Radioactive" was written by Imagine Dragons and producer Alex Da Kid. It is one of the more electronically influenced tracks on Night Visions as well as one of the darkest, similar to fourth track "Demons". The song is an electronic rock and alternative rock song with elements of dubstep. The song's lyrics speak of apocalyptic themes: 'I'm waking up to ash and dust' and 'This is it, the apocalypse'.  Though the band has publicly maintained its secularity, NPR music critic Ann Powers has opined that the song features strong "religious or spiritual imagery", the likes of which have been common throughout the history of rock music.

Speaking on the song, lead singer Dan Reynolds said:

The song is written in the key of B dorian; a mode of A major in which B is used as the tonic note.

Critical reception

"Radioactive" was released to positive reviews. Anne Erickson of Audio Ink Radio gave the song a rating of 4.5 out of 5, calling it "hook-y [and] emotional", and stated that the "drama" and "excitement" of the song would allow "Radioactive" to appeal to both alternative pop fans and hard rockers. AbsolutePunk gave a positive review, calling the acoustic section of the song "haunting", and called the chorus "hypnotizing". Dara Hickey of Unreality Shout also reacted positively, calling the song the "darkest moment" on the album, and stated that, like all the other songs on the album, "Radioactive" was successful in creating a sound that "never fails to take off and send fists skyward". IGN lauded the song, calling it "strangely intense and abrasive", and stated that "Radioactive" was "perhaps the greatest calling card of Imagine Dragons".

Crave Online called the song an "opening throb", saying that the song "sexes up the dub-flirtation with a verse hingeing on the line 'this is it, the apocalypse' and a triumphant chorus, with more than a few shades of Hip-Hop in the production", and that the song was as "radio-ready as they come". Our Vinyl stated that the "power of this song is outstanding with heavy drums and more of an electronic feel than the rest of the album and strong, impressive vocals from front-man Dan Reynolds which are reciprocated throughout the LP." Jon Dolan of Rolling Stone was critical of the song, calling it "a dour moaner that sound[s] like Chris Martin trying to write an Eminem ballad about the end of the world."

In 2018, Billboard and Louder Sound ranked the song number two and number one, respectively, on their lists of the 10 greatest Imagine Dragons songs.

It is also on the soundtrack for NBA 2K14, the first NBA 2K game on PlayStation 4 and Xbox One.

Chart performance
"Radioactive" debuted at 96 on the Billboard Hot 100 after the release of Night Visions in September 2012 and remained at the lower ends of the chart for some time. In April 2013, the song made its top ten entry at number seven, besting the number 15 position set by previous single "It's Time". In mid June, the song reached number four, breaking the record for the slowest ascension to the top five, besting the previous holder Florida Georgia Line's song "Cruise", which broke the record just three weeks earlier. Two weeks later, the song reached its peak at number three. The song formerly held the record for the longest reign atop the Billboard Hot Rock Songs chart at 23 weeks before being surpassed by Walk the Moon's "Shut Up and Dance". "Radioactive" currently holds the record for the longest reign atop the Billboard Rock Airplay chart, with 24 weeks.

The song is also the best-selling rock song in US digital history. It was the No. 2 Song of the Summer according to Billboard and spent 87 weeks on the Billboard Hot 100, breaking the all-time chart longevity record, previously held by Jason Mraz's 2008 single "I'm Yours", and overtaken by The Weeknd's 2019 single "Blinding Lights", which spent 90 weeks on the Hot 100 as of the chart issue dated September 4, 2021. However, it still holds the record for most consecutive weeks on the Hot 100, at 85. It has sold more copies in a calendar year than any other song by a rock act in digital history. "Radioactive" was the third best selling song of 2013 with sales of 5,496,000 for the year. It has gone on to sell 8,234,360 digital copies in the nation as of September 2017, and was certified Diamond by the Recording Industry Association of America (RIAA).

The song has reached number one in Sweden and in the top twenty of several countries such as Australia, Canada, New Zealand as well as several parts of Europe. In the UK, the song debuted at 35 thanks to strong downloads from the Hear Me EP in November. After the release of Night Visions in April, the song peaked at number 12, becoming their highest charting single there.

Music video
The music video debuted on December 10, 2012. Directed by Syndrome and featuring puppeteers from Puppet Heap, the video revolves around a mysterious female drifter (played by actress Alexandra Daddario) on a quest to save her friends in Imagine Dragons from the perils of a sinister, underground puppet-fighting ring led by actor Lou Diamond Phillips. The Champion of the fight, Gorigula, a large purple beast, beats and kills innocent stuffed animals and puppets forced to fight. After one puppet, Screaming Richard, is killed, the woman's pink teddy bear puppet enters the ring and fights Gorigula, initially being beaten up. After rising from the ground, the teddy bear knocks out Gorigula with a single superpower punch. The ringleader sends two bodyguards to subdue the teddy, whose laser vision disintegrates both of them. The remaining spectators flee, leaving the drifter with the stunned ringleader. The drifter takes a key off the chain around the ringleader's neck and the pink bear pulls the lever, causing the ringleader to fall in the dungeon. The drifter unlocks the door and frees the band. They climb out, while one member notices both the pink bear and the dog puppets on her shoulders. The ringleader is left in the dungeon where the earlier-defeated puppets and stuffed animals soon surround and attack him.

Speaking of the video to MTV, Reynolds said "We read through a ton of scripts from really talented directors, and we came across one that stood out to us in particular, because it put into visuals the general theme of the song, which is kind of an empowering song about an awakening, but it did it in a way that was very different". "A lot of people probably see a post-apocalyptic world when they hear 'Radioactive', understandably, but we wanted to deliver something that was maybe a little different from that ... a lot different from that."

As of December 2021, the music video has over 1.4 billion views on YouTube, making it the group's third most viewed video. It also has over 9 million likes.

Credits and personnel
Adapted from Night Visions liner notes.

Imagine Dragons
Dan Reynolds – lead and backing vocals
Wayne Sermon – guitars, backing vocals
Ben McKee – synthesizers, bass guitar, backing vocals
Daniel Platzman – drums, drum machine

Additional musicians
J Browz – guitar

Additional personnel
Alexander Grant – co-writer, producer
Josh Mosser – co-writer
Manny Marroquin – mixing
Joe LaPorta – mastering

Live performances

The first televised performance of "Radioactive" was executed on the September 4, 2012 airing of ABC late-night talk show Jimmy Kimmel Live!. The song was performed alongside then-current single "It's Time".

In February 2013, the band started the 145-date Night Visions Tour, which saw the band perform across North America and Europe. During the North American leg, the band made their first national television appearance, performing "Radioactive" on the February 22, 2013 airing of CBS late-night talk show Late Show with David Letterman.

In addition to performing the song on the March 28, 2013 airing of NBC late-night talk show The Tonight Show with Jay Leno, the band also performed "Radioactive" on the July 29, 2013 airing of NBC late-night talk show Late Night with Jimmy Fallon, following the historic performance of "It's Time" to an empty audience during Hurricane Sandy on the October 29, 2012 airing of Late Night. They performed the song on Saturday Night Live with a guest performance by Kendrick Lamar on February 2, 2014, recreating their teamed performance of the song at the Grammy Awards the previous month.

As one of Taylor Swift's many guest appearances on her 1989 World Tour, the band performed the song with Swift herself in Detroit, Michigan.

Typical live performances of the song now have incorporated a drum solo and a guitar solo.

Remixes and covers
"Weird Al" Yankovic recorded a parody version entitled "Inactive" for his 2014 album Mandatory Fun.
"Radioactive" was covered by American violinist Lindsey Stirling with Texan a cappella group Pentatonix and uploaded to Stirling's YouTube channel, becoming immensely successful and as of February 2023 has over 190 million views. The recording subsequently earned a 2013 YouTube Award.
Jason Derulo covered the song live on BBC.
Daughtry covered the song live on SiriusXM.
Lady Antebellum covered the song live backstage on their Take Me Downtown Tour and put the video on their YouTube channel.
Jake Bugg covered the song live on BBC Radio 1.
Radioactive (The Dirty Tees Remix) Featured on the film The Host's soundtrack.

American production duo Synchronice released a melodic dubstep remix of the song which accumulated over 20,000,000 plays on YouTube and over 15,000,000 plays on their own SoundCloud page.

Dutch symphonic metal band Within Temptation recorded a version on their cover album The Q-Music Sessions released in April 2013 and released again on their album Hydra. American post-hardcore band Our Last Night covered the song.
Masha covered "Radioactive" on her popular YouTube channel on May 25, 2013; the video has received 130,000 views as of December 2018. The Radioactive Chicken Heads recorded a punk rock cover of "Radioactive" and released a music video for their version on YouTube. Ed Kowalczyk (of Live) covered the song for an Australian radio station. Country music artist Dallas Smith covered the song on his Tippin' Point tour.

Independent American singer Madilyn Bailey recorded an acoustic cover that reached number 36 on SNEP, the official French singles chart, in June 2015. Kelly Clarkson covered the song as part of her "Fan Requests" on July 12, 2015, during her Piece by Piece Tour.

Welsh Metalcore band Bullet for My Valentine recorded a cover in 2018 on their sixth studio album Gravity.

In 2022, Just Dance 2023 Edition was released with Radioactive as one of its playable tracks. The choreography for the game features the first Just Dance (video game series) performer to be wheelchair-bound.

Charts

Weekly charts

Year-end charts

Decade-end charts

All-time charts

Certifications

Accolades

Release history

Kendrick Lamar Remix

The Night Visions track was remixed by the band, featuring guest vocals from American rapper Kendrick Lamar. The remix, while retaining most of the original track from Continued Silence, was recorded by the band and Kendrick Lamar for release as a single. The single was released on January 27, 2014.

Live performances
"Radioactive" was first performed by Imagine Dragons and Kendrick Lamar at the 56th Annual Grammy Awards, held at the Staples Center, Los Angeles on January 26, 2014. The song was performed in a mashup with Kendrick Lamar's "M.A.A.D City", a track from his Grammy-nominated album Good Kid, M.A.A.D City. It was the second most tweeted music moment of 2014. The song was performed by the duo again on the February 1, 2014 airing of NBC late-night live television sketch comedy and variety show Saturday Night Live.

Track listing

Credits and personnel
Partly adapted from Night Visions liner notes.

Imagine Dragons
Dan Reynolds – vocals
Wayne Sermon – guitar
Ben McKee – bass
Daniel Platzman – drums, viola

Additional personnel
Alexander Grant – co-writer, producer
Josh Mosser – co-writer
Timmy 2Tone – co-writer
Manny Marroquin – mixing
Joe LaPorta – mastering

Additional musicians
Kendrick Lamar – vocals
J Browz – guitar

Charts

Accolades

Release history

See also 
 List of best-selling singles in Australia

References

External links

Kendrick Lamar & Imagine Dragon’s 2014 Grammy Performance
 

Imagine Dragons songs
Kendrick Lamar songs
2012 songs
2012 singles
2014 singles
Number-one singles in Sweden
Song recordings produced by Alex da Kid
Songs written by Alex da Kid
Songs written by Wayne Sermon
Songs written by Dan Reynolds (musician)
Songs written by Daniel Platzman
Songs written by Ben McKee
Kidinakorner singles
Interscope Records singles
Electronic rock songs
Music videos featuring puppetry